David Glenn Patterson (born July 25, 1956) is a former pitcher in Major League Baseball who made 36 relief appearances for the Los Angeles Dodgers in its 1979 season. Listed at 6' 0", 170 lb., Patterson batted and threw right handed. He was born in Springfield, Missouri.

Patterson attended Cerritos College and was drafted by the Dodgers in the 2nd round of the 1976 MLB Draft.

He is a resident of Raytown, Missouri since 2016.

External links
, or Retrosheet, or Pelota Binaria (Venezuelan Winter League)

Living people
1956 births
Albuquerque Dukes players
Baseball players from Missouri
Cardenales de Lara players
American expatriate baseball players in Venezuela
Cerritos Falcons baseball players
Danville Dodgers players
Lodi Dodgers players
Los Angeles Dodgers players
Major League Baseball pitchers
People from  Springfield, Missouri
San Antonio Dodgers players
Tacoma Tigers players
People from Raytown, Missouri